The redeye tetra (Moenkhausia sanctaefilomenae), is a species of tetra from the São Francisco, upper Paraná, Paraguay and Uruguay river basins in eastern and central South America. This freshwater fish is commonly kept in aquariums and bred in large numbers at commercial facilities in Eastern Europe and Asia.

The red-eye tetra has a bright silver body accented by a white-edged black basal half of the tail and a thin red circle around its eye. It is part of a group that consists of three similar species, the two others being M. forestii (upper Paraguay and upper Paraná basins) and M. oligolepis (Amazon and Paraguay basins, and the Guianas).

In the aquarium

The redeye tetra's hardiness and ease of care makes it an excellent beginner fish. It is readily available, peaceful, and is suitable for most community aquariums, although it is quite active and may disturb slower, more timid species. Although generally peaceful, some redeye tetras have been known to be fin nippers on rare occasions, even when kept in groups.

The Redeye tetra is a schooling fish and are to be kept in groups of 6 or more. If kept alone it may nip the fins of other fish. A fish tank with volume of about 110 Litres (29 US G.) is recommended.

These species do best at temperatures of 72–79 °F in a planted tank with plenty of shoaling space. Redeyes tolerate a range of water conditions but prefer slightly soft, acid water.

Nutrition
In the wild the redeye tetra feeds on worms, insects, crustaceans and plant matter. In the aquarium redeye tetra generally eat all kinds of live, fresh, and flake foods. To keep good balance they are given a high-quality flake food every day. Brine shrimp (either live or frozen) are given as a treat to them.

Breeding
Females are larger and have a more rounded abdomen than the males. When attempting to breed them, a separate breeding tank should be set up with slightly acidic, very soft water (4 dGH or below). The Red-eye tetra is free spawning but will also lay eggs among the roots of floating plants.
Once spawning has occurred, the mating pair should be removed, as they will consume the eggs and hatching fry. One day after they are laid, the eggs will hatch. The fry can initially be fed infusoria, rotifers, or commercially prepared fry foods, then freshly hatched brine shrimp, and eventually finely crushed flake foods.

References

External links 

Red Eye Tetra Fact Sheet
Aqua Hobby
The Tropical Tank
Mongabay

Tetras
Fish of the São Francisco River basin
Taxa named by Franz Steindachner
Fish described in 1907